Korsnäs IF FK is a Swedish football club located in Falun.

Background
Korsnäs IF FK currently plays in Division 3 Södra Norrland which is the fifth tier of Swedish football. They play their home matches at Lindvallen in Falun.

The club is affiliated to Dalarnas Fotbollförbund. Korsnäs IF have competed in the Svenska Cupen on 23 occasions and have played 59 matches in the competition.

Season to season

Footnotes

External links
 Korsnäs IF FK – Official website

Football clubs in Dalarna County
Association football clubs established in 1904
1904 establishments in Sweden